Epischnia leucoloma is a species of snout moth in the genus Epischnia. It was described by Gottlieb August Wilhelm Herrich-Schäffer in 1849, and it is known from Spain, Italy, Croatia and Greece.

References

Moths described in 1849
Phycitini
Moths of Europe
Moths of Asia